Canadys is an unincorporated community in Colleton County, South Carolina, United States. Canadys had a post office from April 16, 1926, until January 11, 1992; it still has its own ZIP code, 29433.

Coal-fired power plant
A coal-fired power plant, the Canadys Station Power Plant, was located near Canadys and operated by the South Carolina Electric & Gas Company, but was retired in 2013.

Railroad
The power plant was served by Hampton and Branchville Railroad. With the loss of coal traffic formerly shipped to the power plant, the railroad is now largely dormant.

References

Unincorporated communities in Colleton County, South Carolina
Unincorporated communities in South Carolina